The Union for Europe (UFE) was a conservative political group in the European Parliament that existed from 1995 to 1999. The group was formed during the 4th European Parliament term in July 1995 from a merger of the European Democratic Alliance and Forza Europa parliamentary groups, becoming the third largest group by number of MEPs. The group was succeeded in the 5th European Parliament by the Union for Europe of the Nations (UEN), while key UFE member parties Forza Italia and Rally for the Republic instead joined the European People's Party.

Members

References

External links
Democracy in the European Parliament
Group names 1999
UFE on Europe Politique
European Parliament profile of Jean-Claude Pasty

Former European Parliament party groups
Conservatism in Europe